Victoria Davies (born 7 August 1972) is a British former professional tennis player.

Davies, who comes from Bridgend, South Wales, played college tennis in the United States for the University of South Carolina. She was a doubles semifinalist at the 1994 NCAA Doubles Championships, partnering Helen Crook.

On the professional tour she featured most successfully as a doubles player, winning eight titles on the ITF Women's Circuit. She played main-draw doubles in six editions of the Wimbledon Championships.

ITF Circuit finals

Doubles (8–15)

References

External links
 
 

1972 births
Living people
British female tennis players
Welsh female tennis players
South Carolina Gamecocks women's tennis players